is the 18th single by Japanese idol girl group SKE48. It was released on August 12, 2015. It was number-one on the Oricon Weekly Singles Chart with 370,135 copies sold. It was the fourteenth best-selling single of 2015 in Japan according to the Oricon Yearly Singles Chart, with 459,769 copies sold. As of January 25, 2016 it had sold 461,604 copies. It was also number-one on the Billboard Japan Hot 100.

This single marks the last appearance of Rena Matsui, which is center of the main track, and also sang "2588 Nichi", her graduation song (Full audio published on YouTube). Unfortunately, only short versions from their music videos are featured on YouTube, and full versions are included only on limited editions.

Track listing

Type-A

Type-B

Type-C

Type-D

Theater Edition

Charts

Year-end charts

References

2015 singles
2015 songs
Japanese-language songs
SKE48 songs
Oricon Weekly number-one singles
Billboard Japan Hot 100 number-one singles
Avex Trax singles
Song articles with missing songwriters
Songs written by Katsuhiko Sugiyama